Moveworks is an American artificial intelligence (AI) company headquartered in Mountain View, California. The company develops an AI platform, designed for large enterprises, that uses natural language understanding (NLU), probabilistic machine learning, and automation to resolve workplace requests.

Moveworks’ customers include Autodesk, Broadcom, and other firms. Employees converse with the Moveworks chatbot to submit their requests, which Moveworks analyzes and then resolves via integrations with other software applications. Moveworks is available in business communication tools such as Slack and Microsoft Teams, as well as through online platforms such as ServiceNow and SharePoint.   

As of its Series C financing round in June 2021, Moveworks is valued at $2.1 billion and has raised $315 million in total funding. The company’s investors include Tiger Global, Alkeon Capital, and other firms.

History 
Moveworks was founded in 2016 by Bhavin Shah (CEO), Vaibhav Nivargi (CTO), Varun Singh (Vice President of Product), and Jiang Chen (Vice President of Machine Learning). 

Prior to Moveworks, Shah had served as CEO of startup and iOS app Refresh.io, which was acquired by LinkedIn; Nivargi had founded ClearStory Data, a big data and analytics company; and Singh was a product management leader at Facebook, where his work focused on machine learning and chatbots. Chen had spent nearly six years on a natural language processing (NLP) research team at Google, whose search engine was considerably more sophisticated than the enterprise search systems that most companies employed at the time.

The founders recognized the potential of an AI-powered chatbot to resolve a significant portion of employees’ support issues, without involvement from a corporate help desk. This model would enable self-service for employees with common requests or questions.

After working with a group of lighthouse customers to automate IT support use cases, Moveworks came out of "stealth mode" in April 2019, following a $30 million Series A investment from Lightspeed Venture Partners and Bain Capital. The company raised a $75 million Series B round in November 2019 and a $200 million Series C round in June 2021.

Moveworks initially solved employees’ IT support issues. In March 2021, the company expanded its Employee Service Platform to address issues concerning other lines of business, including HR, finance, and facilities. Moveworks also released an internal communications solution that allows company leaders to send interactive messages to employees.

Moveworks was recognized as the Best Chatbot Solution at the 2021 AI Breakthrough Awards, named to the Forbes AI 50 in 2019,  2020, and 2021, and selected as one of the Most Innovative Tech Companies of the Year at the 2021 American Business Awards.

Technology 
The Moveworks platform comprises a multitude of specialized machine learning models, such as variants of the BERT language model. These models are trained on historical support tickets in order to process and fulfill new requests; for example, answering policy questions, accessing software, and editing email groups. As of October 2021, Moveworks is capable of resolving requests written in across 100+ languages.

A central goal of Moveworks' machine learning process is to augment the "small data" of its customers. Training deep learning models often requires very large data sets; for example, millions of annotated requests for a new laptop. Whereas few companies possess a sufficient quantity of such requests from their own employees, Moveworks leverages Collective Learning across many companies to make high-accuracy predictions about how to resolve a given issue.

Integrations and partnerships 
Moveworks has announced partnerships and co-marketing initiatives with several business communication tools, including Microsoft Teams, Slack, and Cisco Webex. The Moveworks platform enables employees to leverage workflows and find resources housed in many applications, via a user interface in these communication tools.

Consequently, the platform integrates with a variety of enterprise applications: IT Service Management platforms, Identity and Access Management tools, knowledge management systems, and facilities management systems, among others.

References 

Business software companies
Applications of artificial intelligence
American companies established in 2016